Cryptovaranoides ("hidden lizard-like animal") is an extinct genus of lizard from the Late Triassic of England. It contains a single species, Cryptovaranoides microlanius. 

It is represented by a holotype partial skeleton as well as referred isolated bones from Rhaetian-aged fissure fill-deposits in Cromhall Quarry, near Tortworth, Gloucestershire preserved alongside the common fossil rhynchocephalian Clevosaurus. The type specimen had been collected in 1953, but was only described as a distinct taxon in 2022. Several traits such as braincase, neck vertebrae, skull architecture, and teeth arrangement support Cryptovaranoides' classification as a squamate.

Cryptovaranoides marks the earliest known occurrence of a crown group squamate, with previous fossils known only as early as the Middle Jurassic; the discovery of Cryptovaranoides pushes back the estimated origin of modern squamates by 35 million years. A phylogenetic analysis placed Cryptovaranoides within the Anguimorpha as sister to the Neoanguimorpha (containing modern helodermatids, anguids, and knob-scaled lizards), supporting a much more ancient estimate for the radiation of modern squamate lineages than previously assumed.

References

Anguimorpha
Triassic England
Taxa named by Michael Benton
Fossil taxa described in 2022